Æthelthryth (or Æðelþryð or Æþelðryþe; 23 June 679 AD) was an East Anglian princess, a Fenland and Northumbrian queen and Abbess of Ely. She is an Anglo-Saxon saint, and is also known as Etheldreda or Audrey, especially in religious contexts. Her father was King Anna of East Anglia, and her siblings were Wendreda and Seaxburh of Ely, both of whom eventually retired from secular life and founded abbeys.

Life 

Æthelthryth was probably born in Exning, near Newmarket in Suffolk.  She was one of the four saintly daughters of Anna of East Anglia, including Wendreda and Seaxburh of Ely, all of whom eventually retired from secular life and founded abbeys.

Æthelthryth made an early first marriage in around 652 to Tondberct, chief or prince of the South Gyrwe. She managed to persuade her husband to respect her vow of perpetual virginity that she had made prior to their marriage. Upon his death in 655, she retired to the Isle of Ely, which she had received from Tondberct as a morning gift.

Æthelthryth was subsequently remarried for political reasons in 660, this time to Ecgfrith of Northumbria, who was fourteen or fifteen at the time. Shortly after his accession to the throne in 670, Æthelthryth wished to become a nun. This step possibly led to Ecgfrith's long quarrel with Wilfrid, bishop of York, who was her spiritual counsellor. One account relates that while Ecgfrith initially agreed Æthelthryth should continue to remain a virgin, about 672 he appealed to Wilfrid for the enforcement of his marital rights as against Etheldreda's religious vocation. The bishop succeeded at first in persuading the king to consent that Etheldreda should live for some time in peace as a sister of the Coldingham nunnery, founded by his aunt, Æbbe of Coldingham. Eventually, in light of the danger of being forcibly carried off by the king, Æthelthryth then fled back to the Isle of Ely with two nuns as companions. They managed to evade capture, thanks in part to the rising of the tide.

Another version of the legend related that she halted on the journey at 'Stow' and sheltered under a miraculously growing ash tree which came from her staff planted in the ground. Stow came to be known as 'St Etheldred's Stow', when a church was built to commemorate this event. It is more likely that this 'Stow' actually refers to another fair, near Threekingham. Ecgfrith later married Eormenburg and expelled Wilfrid from his kingdom in 678. According to the Anglo-Saxon Chronicle, Æthelthryth founded a double monastery at Ely in 673, which was later destroyed in the Danish invasion of 870.

Legacy 

Bede told how after her death, Æthelthryth's bones were disinterred by her sister and successor, Seaxburh and that her uncorrupted body was later buried in a white, marble coffin. In 695, Seaxburh translated the remains of her sister Æthelthryth, who had been dead for sixteen years, from a common grave to the new church at Ely. The Liber Eliensis describes these events in detail. When her grave was opened, Æthelthryth's body was discovered to be uncorrupted and her coffin and clothes proved to possess miraculous powers. A sarcophagus made of white marble was taken from the Roman ruins at Grantchester, which was found to be the right fit for Æthelthryth.  Seaxburh supervised the preparation of her sister's body, which was washed and wrapped in new robes before being reburied. She apparently oversaw the translation of her sister's remains without the supervision of her bishop, using her knowledge of procedures gained from her family's links with the Faremoutiers Abbey as a basis for the ceremony.

After Seaxburh, Æthelthryth's niece and her great-niece, both of whom were royal princesses, succeeded her as abbess of Ely.

The church of St Etheldreda  Histon was demolished, it is commemorated in a stained glass window.

St Etheldreda's Church in Ely Place in Holborn is dedicated to the saint.  It was originally part of the palace of the bishops of Ely. After the English Reformation, the palace was used by the Spanish ambassadors, enabling Roman Catholic worship to continue in the church.

St Etheldreda's Church, Hatfield is 13th century and was originally Saxon. It was named for Saint Etheldreda because it was adjacent to the Palace of the Bishops of Ely who held her as their patron saint.

St Etheldreda's is a Roman Catholic parish church in Ely, Cambridgeshire. It is part of the Diocese of East Anglia within the Province of Westminster. The church contains the shrine and relics of Æthelthryth, including her hand.

St. Etheldreda's Church in White Notley, Essex, is a Church of England parish church, of Saxon construction, built on the site of a Roman temple, with a large quantity of Roman brick in its fabric. The church has a small Mediaeval English stained glass window, depicting St. Etheldreda, which is set in a stone frame made from a very early Insular Christian Roman Chi Rho grave marker.

The common version of Æthelthryth's name was St. Audrey, which is the origin of the word tawdry, which derived from the fact that her admirers bought modestly concealing lace goods at an annual fair held in her name in Ely. By the 17th century, this lacework had become seen as old-fashioned, vain, or cheap and of poor quality, at a time when the Puritans of eastern England disdained ornamental dress.

Etheldreda is remembered in the Church of England with a Lesser Festival on 23 June.

Hagiography 

There are a number of accounts of Æthelthryth's life in Latin, Old English, Old French, and Middle English. According to Jocelyn Wogan-Browne, "more medieval vernacular lives [about Æthelthryth] were composed in England than any other native female saint". Æthelthryth appears in Bede's Ecclesiastical History of the English People, Ælfric's Lives of Saints, Goscelin of Saint-Bertin's Lives of Female Saints, the Liber Eliensis, Marie de France's La vie seinte Audree, the South English Legendary, and a Middle English life in BL Cotton Faustina B.iii, among others. A modern fictional account has been written by Moyra Caldecott.

See also 

 List of Anglo-Saxon saints
 Saint Æthelthryth, patron saint archive
 Wuffingas
 The hymn 'Aethelthryth' by the Venerable Bede

References

Sources
 Blanton, Virginia (2007) Signs of Devotion: the cult of St Aethelthryth in medieval England, 695–1615. University Park, Pa: Pennsylvania State University Press 
 
 Dockray-Miller, B. (2009) Saints Edith and Æthelthryth: Princesses, Miracle Workers, and their Late Medieval Audience; the Wilton Chronicle and the Wilton Life of St Æthelthryth, Turnhout: Brepols Publishers .
 Maccarron, Máirín, "The Adornment of Virgins: Æthelthryth and Her Necklaces," in Elizabeth Mullins and Diarmuid Scully (eds), Listen, O Isles, unto me: Studies in Medieval Word and Image in honour of Jennifer O’Reilly (Cork, 2011), 142–155.
 Major, Tristan, "Saint Etheldreda in the South English Legendary," Anglia 128.1 (2010), 83–101.
 McCash, June Hall & Judith Clark Barban, ed. and trans. (2006) The Life of Saint Audrey; a text by Marie de France. Jefferson, NC: McFarland 
 Wogan-Browne, Jocelyn, "Rerouting the Dower: The Anglo-Norman Life of St. Audrey by Marie (of Chatteris?)", in Power of the Weak: Studies on Medieval Women, ed. Jennifer Carpenter and Sally-Beth Maclean (Champaign: University of Illinois Press, 1995), 27–56.

Further reading

External links 

 
 Richard John King, 1862. Handbook of the Cathedrals of England (Oxford) ( On-line text)
  

630s births
679 deaths
Anglo-Saxon nuns
Abbesses of Ely
Anglo-Saxon royal consorts
East Anglian saints
East Anglian princesses
Ely, Cambridgeshire
Burials at Ely Cathedral
7th-century English nuns
7th-century Christian saints
Incorrupt saints
Founders of Christian monasteries
Female saints of medieval England
Anglican saints

Year of birth uncertain